Brian Higgins (born February 6, 1982) is an American radio and television sportscaster working for the Syracuse University athletic department, the Syracuse IMG sports network and Time Warner Cable sports. Since 2004, he has served as the play by play voice of Syracuse women's basketball and men's lacrosse teams. 

In 2006, he began hosting the pre-game, halftime, and post-game shows during every Syracuse football game.  He was the play by play announcer for the Tri-City ValleyCats minor league baseball team in the 2002 through 2004 seasons and has done play by play for the Syracuse Chiefs baseball and the SU men's basketball and football team. He is the host of "Syracuse in 60" football recap show on TWCS and does play by play of various collegiate and high school events.

Higgins graduated magna cum laude from the S. I. Newhouse School of Public Communications in 2004 with a dual degree in broadcast journalism and political science.  While an undergraduate, he worked for WAER radio where he provided play by play for Orangemen football, basketball, and lacrosse.

References 

Minor League Baseball broadcasters
College basketball announcers in the United States
Syracuse Orange football announcers
1982 births
Living people
Lacrosse announcers
American sports announcers
Women's college basketball announcers in the United States
High school football announcers in the United States
S.I. Newhouse School of Public Communications alumni